The 2017 S.League season is Tampines Rovers's 22nd season at the top level of Singapore football and 72nd year in existence as a football club. The club will also compete in the Singapore League Cup, Singapore Cup, Singapore Community Shield and the AFC Cup.

Key events

January
On 4/1/2017, Khairul Amri joined the Stag's club despite offers from Hougang United and Warriors FC.

On 7/1/2017, Hafiz Sujad left the club to join Thailand League 2 club, BBCU FC.

On 13/1/2017, it is reported that Daniel Bennett had crossed over from the Stags' fierce rival, Geylang International for the new season after his contract is not renewed at the end of the 2016 season.

On 24/1/2017, Tampines Rovers' AFC Champions League dreams were dashed after they were beaten 2-0 by Global FC from the Philippines.

On 27/1/2017, coach, Akbar Nawas parted ways with the Stag after it was reported that they had been looking at various options since the end of 2016 season.

February
On 1/2/2017, Jurgen Raab was announced as the new coach for the team, signing a 3 years contract.

On 8/2/2017, it was reported that Sahil Suhaimi will sign for the team but only play in the AFC Cup competition.

On 10/2/2017, Singaporean-American, Raspreet Sandhu from Sonoma State University signed for the club to play in the AFC Cup.

On 21/2/2017, the Stags kicked off their AFC Cup campaign with a 2-1 win against Felda United.

On 26/2/2017, Stags failed to stop Albirex Niigata (S) from winning their 5th consecutive title, the Charity Shield.

March
On 3/3/2017, the Stags won their 1st match of the 2017 Sleague season by beating Hougang United 2-1.

On 6/3/2017, it was reported that some of the players were not pay on time, sparkling fears of money issue the club faced in 2016.

On 7/3/2017, the club lost 5-0 in Philippines to Ceres Negro.  This is a landmark victory for a Philippines club in their AFC Cup history.

On 14/3/2017, 7 Stags were called up to the National Team for the matches against Afghanistan & Bahrain.  The 7 players were Izwan Mahbud, Shakir Hamzah, Madhu Mohana, Daniel Bennett, Mustafic Fahrudin, Yasir Hanapi & Khairul Amri.

On 15/3/2017, another trashing in the AFC Cup for the Stags against Hanoi FC. They lost 4-0 in Hanoi.

On 16/3/2017, captain Madhu Mohana was handed a suspended $1,000 fine for his comments on social media directed at referee Sukhbir Singh after they lost to Albirex in the Charity Shield.

April
On 4/4/2017, the Stags concede a last minute goal to Hanoi to lost their 3rd consecutive match in the continental tournament.

On 8/4/2017, it was announced that Sahil Suhaimi who was only registered for the AFC Cup will be joining English Premier League club Burnley FC for a month-long training stint.

May
On 3/5/2017, the team was knocked out of the AFC Cup competition after failing to win their last group match against Ceres Negro FC.

On 12/5/2017, the Stags beat the unbeaten Protectors by 3-2 to go to #2 in the table.

On 16/5/2017, long term injured player, Fazrul Nawaz announced that has set a target of June for his full comeback after making his return to national training on 15/5/2017 following an eight-month absence.

June
On 21/6/2017, Tampines chairman Krishna Ramachandra announced he is stepping down from duty after 19months in-charge.

July
On 28/7/2017, the team returned to Tampines for their home game.  The 1st home game after years away is against Brunei DPMM.

September
On 7/9/2017, Desmond Ong is appointed as the new chairman of the club.

Squad

Sleague Squad

Prime League Squad

Coaching staff

Transfers

Pre-season transfers
Source

In

Out

Mid-season transfers

In

Out

Trial

Friendlies

Pre-season friendlies

In Season Friendlies

Team statistics

Appearances and goals

Competitions

Overview

S.League

Singapore Cup

Quarter-final

Tampines Rovers lost 1-7 on aggregate.

Singapore TNP League Cup

AFC Champions League

Qualifying play-off

AFC Cup

Group stage

References

Singaporean football clubs 2017 season
Tampines Rovers FC seasons